"Paint the Town and Hang the Moon Tonight" is a song recorded by American country music artist J.C. Crowley. It was released in October 1988 as the second single from his album Beneath the Texas Moon. The song peaked at number 13 on the Billboard Hot Country Singles chart.

Chart performance

Year-end charts

References

1988 singles
J.C. Crowley songs
RCA Records singles
Song recordings produced by Josh Leo
1988 songs
Songs written by J.C. Crowley